Three Questions (stylized as ) is the third studio album by Japanese electronica singer Mitsuki Aira, released on November 17, 2010, in Japan by D-Topia Universe with distribution by Universal Music Japan. The album includes songs that were previously unreleased. This is also the first album to be released under D-topia Entertainment's new label, D-Topia Universe. The promotional singles for the album were "Aishi Aisarete Ikiru no Sa" and "Why Two?". The album peaked at the number 45 position on the Oricon weekly charts, selling a total of 2,758 copies.

The album contains a cover of a Kenji Ozawa song, "Aishi Aisarete Ikiru no Sa" and the album's closing track, "Love Re:", which was written and produced by Korean producers Han Jae-Ho, Kim Seung-Su, and An Jung-Sung, who also produce songs for South Korean girl group Kara.

Track listing
The CD only version includes the original track "Last Love" but in the CD+DVD version, the track "Rainbow" replaces "Last Love" on track seven.

CD+DVD / Limited edition

CD only / Normal edition

DVD
 Aishi Aisarete Ikiru no sa (Music Clip)
 Aishi Aisarete Ikiru no sa (Music Clip Making)
 Why Two? (Music Clip)
 Why Two? (Music Clip Making)

Charts

Sales and certifications

Release history

References

External links
 ??? album detail at official website

2010 albums
Aira Mitsuki albums